The Directive on combating violence against women and domestic violence is an EU  Directive proposal by the European Commission tabled on 8 March 2022.

The European Commission proposed an EU-wide legislation in this area following a request to act by the European Parliament. In September 2021, Members of the European Parliament called on the European Commission to legislate to prevent violence against women and support the victims. The objective of the initiative was to make violence against women and domestic violence a crime under EU law, along with already criminalized conduct such as cybercrime, sexual exploitation and money laundering for example.

Under the proposal by the European Commission gender-based violence would be indeed considered as a crime under Article 83 of the Treaty on the Functioning of the European Union.

The initiative was called for by the European Women's Lobby in order to translate into EU legislation the standards of the Istanbul Convention on gender-based violence.

References

External links
Text of the directive proposal

European Union directives
Draft European Union laws
Violence against women
Gender-related violence
Crimes against women